Boet van Dulmen (19 May 1948 – 16 September 2021) was a Dutch Grand Prix motorcycle road racer. Together with Wil Hartog and Jack Middelburg, he was part of a contingent of Dutch riders who competed at the highest levels of Grand Prix racing in the late 1970s. Van Dulmen was known for his skill of riding in wet weather. In 1979, he won his only 500cc race at the Finnish Grand Prix.

Career statistics

Grand Prix motorcycle racing

Races by year
(key) (Races in bold indicate pole position) (Races in italics indicate fastest lap)

Death
Van Dulmen was killed in a road accident on 16 September 2021. He was hit by a delivery van while riding his bicycle and, despite surgical intervention, he died later in hospital.

References 

1948 births
2021 deaths
People from Maasdriel
Dutch motorcycle racers
250cc World Championship riders
350cc World Championship riders
500cc World Championship riders
Road incident deaths in the Netherlands
Sportspeople from Gelderland
20th-century Dutch people